The Hercules InColor Card (GB222) is an IBM PC compatible 8-bit ISA graphics controller card released in April 1987 by Hercules Computer Technology, Inc. It supported a 16-colour (from a palette of 64) 720×350 display on an EGA monitor and software redefinable fonts.

After the success of the monochrome Hercules Graphics Card (HGC) and Hercules Graphics Card Plus (HGC+) which gained wide developer support, the market was changing with the release of new colour cards which were becoming increasingly affordable. So Hercules released the InColor to compete primarily with IBM's new high-end VGA card, and also the many existing EGA compatible cards on the market. The InColor did not bring the success that Hercules had hoped for, and revenue slowly declined until Hercules was eventually acquired by Guillemot Corporation in October 1999 for $8.5m USD.

The card came with drivers for popular programs like Lotus 1-2-3, AutoCAD, WordPerfect 5.0 or Microsoft Windows.

Some compatible games with this card included Karateka, Microsoft Flight Simulator 3.0 and 4, 3-D Helicopter Simulator, RAPCON: Military Air Traffic Control Simulator and Eco Adventures in the Oceans.

See also
Hercules Graphics Card
Hercules Graphics Card Plus
Hercules Network Card Plus

References

Graphics cards
Products introduced in 1987